Thingy may refer to:

 A placeholder name (thingy-ma-bob), used to refer to something you don't remember the name of at the specific moment in time. 
Thingy (band), an Indie rock band
 Slang for thing
 Thingee, an alien puppet character on children's television shows in New Zealand